The Krefeld Pinguine (Krefeld Penguins) are an ice hockey team in the DEL2. Their home ice is in Krefeld, North Rhine-Westphalia, Germany at the König Palast. Founded first in 1936 by Willi Münstermann, the pro team became a limited liability company in 1994 and joined the top tier Deutsche Eishockey Liga. In their history they have won the German championship in 1951,1952, and 2003.

Team names
1936 as "Krefelder Eislauf-Verein 1936 e.V." (KEV)
1978 as "EHC Krefeld"
1981 asc"Krefelder Eislauf-Verein 1981 e.V."
1995 as "KEV Pinguine Eishockey GmbH"

Season records

Players

Current roster

Honored members
1 Karel Lang
2 Uwe Fabig
4 Vic Stanfield
7 Lothar Kremershof
80 Robert Müller

Notable alumni

René Bielke (1993–1995)
Karl Bierschel (1948–1963)
Christoph Brandner (2000–2003)
Dick Decloe (1974–1978)
Christian Ehrhoff (1999–2003, 2012)
Uwe Fabig (1981–1983/1984–1992)
Bruno Guttowski (1951–1958)
Peter Ihnacak (1992–1997)
Ulli Jansen † (1947–1972)
Günter Jochems (1949–1965)
Josef Kompalla (1958–1971)
Erich Konecki † (1948–1952)
Lothar Kremershof † (1969–1978/1981–1985)
Karel Lang (1990–2001)
Petri Liimatainen (1995–1999)
Chris Lindberg (1994–1998)
Jan Marek (1974–1978)
Robert Müller † (2002–2006)
Alexander Selivanov (2003–2008)
Hans Georg Pescher (1948–1956)
Brad Purdie (2000–2003)
James Sargent (1994–1995)
Herbert Schibukat (1949–1954)
Tim Stützle (2014–2017)
Vic Stanfield (1976–1978, 1980–1988)
Herberts Vasiļjevs (2005–2017)
Heinz Wackers (1936–1955)
Remy Wellen (1955–1972)

Notable coaches
Jiří Ehrenberger
Martin Jíranek
Rick Adduono
Butch Goring

References

External links
 

Deutsche Eishockey Liga teams
Ice hockey teams in Germany
Ice hockey clubs established in 1936
1936 establishments in Germany
Sport in Krefeld